The 1989 Chattanooga Moccasins football team represented the University of Tennessee at Chattanooga as a member of the Southern Conference (SoCon) in the 1989 NCAA Division I-AA football season. The Moccasins were led by sixth-year head coach Buddy Nix and played their home games at Charmerlain Field. They finished the season 3–7–1 overall and 2–4–1 in SoCon play to tie for fifth place.

Schedule

References

Chattanooga
Chattanooga Mocs football seasons
Chattanooga Moccasins football